"Angel Baby" was a 1960 single by Rosie and the Originals. The group recorded the song independently on a two-track machine, located in a facility in the small farming community of San Marcos, California. At the time, lead singer Rosie Hamlin was only 15 years old. She had written the lyrics for "Angel Baby" as a poem for "[her] very first boyfriend" when she was a 14-year-old student at Mission Bay High School in San Diego, California. 

Initially unable to find a label willing to distribute the song because of its unpolished sound, the group convinced a San Diego department store to pipe their master through the listening booths in the record department. The response from listeners prompted Highland Records to sign the band and promote the single. Since its release the song has become an oldies standard.

Rosie & The Originals 

The song debuted on the Billboard Hot 100 in December 1960 and remained on the charts for 13 weeks, reaching No. 5 on January 28, 1961.  On the R&B charts, "Angel Baby" also peaked at #5 and remained on that chart for eight weeks. In 1961, "Angel Baby" was also released in Canada (#6) on the Zirkon label and in Australia and England on London Records. The British release slightly edited the intro.

John Lennon

John Lennon recorded a version of the song in 1973, eventually released on the 1986 album Menlove Ave. and later, on the 1990 box set Lennon. A remixed version was released in 2004 as a bonus track on a reissue of Lennon's 1975 Rock 'n' Roll album. In the intro, Lennon calls it one of his favorite songs and says, "send my love to Rosie, wherever she may be." Rosie called it her favorite cover of the song. Circulating tapes of Lennon's 1971 birthday party also include a busked version of the song.

Other versions
 Several versions of the song were released in 1961, including one by Kathy Young, who included it on her album The Sound Of Kathy Young.
Soul singer Charles Brown released the song on a King Records single in 1961
 Girl group Reparata and the Delrons included the song on their 1970 album, Rock 'n' Roll Revolution.
 Avant garde art pop icon Jun Togawa recorded a punk version in 1985, on her best selling Japanese album Suki Suki Daisuki.
 A reggae version was released by Shehene & the Knobs on a single in 1987.
 In 1991, singer Angelica released an album with the song as the title track. Released as a single, Angelica scored a No. 29 hit on the Billboard Hot 100.
The song was covered by actor Wong Chi-zan in a scene for the 1991 Taiwanese film A Brighter Summer Day.
Jeanette Jurado also did a cover that was featured in the 1995 feature film My Family. 
Linda Ronstadt recorded a version for her 1996 album of lullabies, Dedicated to the One I Love.
In 2001 singer Jenni Rivera released a version of the song on her album, Se Las Voy A Dar A Otro. 
In 2001, Texas rocker Roky Erickson and his band The Aliens, recorded a version of the song on the album Don't Knock The Rock
 Yolanda Perez released a version in a mix of English and Spanish on her 2002 album La Potranquita con Banda
Pop singer Tiffany included the song on her 2005 album Dreams Never Die
Black Rebel Motorcycle Club did a cover of this song as an iTunes bonus track on for their 2013 album Specter At The Feast.
System of a Down covered the song live as part of their sole U.S. tour date of 2013 at the Hollywood Bowl in Los Angeles on July 29, 2013.
 In June 2018, El Pollo Loco released a commercial featuring new sauces as part of its Te Amo promotion which included a Spanish language version of Angel Baby remarkably similar to the original version from 1960.

References

External links
History (Site Defunct prior to 10/12)
Angel Baby at Songfacts

1960 songs
1960 singles
1961 singles
Doo-wop songs